Neoregelia sapiatibensis is a species of flowering plant in the genus Neoregelia. This species is endemic to Brazil.

Cultivars
 Neoregelia 'Fatal Attraction'
 Neoregelia 'Hades'
 Neoregelia 'Scandal'

References

BSI Cultivar Registry Retrieved 11 October 2009

sapiatibensis
Flora of Brazil